Esra Ural Topuz (born  18 August 1991) is a Turkish female professional basketball player for Çukurova Basketbol. She represented Turkey in the Basketball competition at the 2016 Summer Olympics.

Honors

Club
 2x Turkish Super League champion (2018, 2019)
 2x Turkish Cup champion (2019, 2020)
 Turkish Presidential Cup champion (2019)

References

External links

1991 births
Living people
Turkish women's basketball players
Basketball players at the 2016 Summer Olympics
Olympic basketball players of Turkey
Abdullah Gül Üniversitesi basketball players
Fenerbahçe women's basketball players
Centers (basketball)
Sportspeople from Mersin
21st-century Turkish women